Charlie Oliver Thurston (born 17 August 1996) is an English cricketer. He made his List A debut for Northamptonshire in the 2018 Royal London One-Day Cup on 7 June 2018. He made his Twenty20 debut for Northamptonshire in the 2018 t20 Blast on 3 August 2018.

References

External links
 

1996 births
Living people
Sportspeople from Cambridge
People educated at Bedford School
English cricketers
Loughborough MCCU cricketers
Northamptonshire cricketers
Bedfordshire cricketers